LGBT members of Kurdish inhabited areas exist in Kurdistan in all ethnicities, religions and cities, and experience various forms of discrimination.

LGBT rights by regions

LGBT rights in Turkish Kurdistan 
Since their founding, the HDP has announced its support for all ethnic, religious, and sexual minorities. In their election manifesto of 2015, they strongly condemned discrimination against LGBTI people. Out of all the 80 people from the HDP executive committee elected in 2015, three of their representatives were LGBT. 

However, not all pro-Kurdish parties support the LGBTI. The Kurdish nationalist and Islamist party known as HüdaPar, and their affiliate the Kurdish Hezbollah are known to be threats to the LGBTI community and to anyone who supports the LGBTI community.

LGBT rights in Iraqi Kurdistan 
The situation of the LGBT community in the Kurdistan Region was sometimes discussed in April 2021, when it was announced that the Kurdish security forces had arrested several homosexuals in Sulaymaniyah. The government denied targeting the group and said its operation was more to crack down on prostitution. Members of the LGBTQ community report widespread discrimination across the Middle East. During its reign of terror in Iraq and Syria, the Islamic State terrorist group released videos in which its members killed gay men by throwing them from rooftops. Experts say a legal loophole is still at the heart of the LGBTQ community's problem. Iraqi human rights lawyer Asrin Jamal said: "Neither the Iraqi law nor the changes of the Kurdistan Region have provided any definition for the LGBTQ community."

The importance of LGBT people in Kurdish culture and art 
Gender has never created an important issue in Kurdish culture, art and politics. Even though the Kurdish society is still very conservative in this regard, in recent times there has been an increase in the number of artists who stand on their sexual orientation without hiding it. Even: it is part of their image as artists and they are generally accepted as such. Among the pioneers of the last 50 years, the former PKK fighter Rotinda, although he never made a statement about his sexual orientation, wrote many Kurdish songs and had a positive impact on millions of Kurds around the world. The musical and literary projects for children that several generations have grown up with should not be forgotten (for example: The Gulên Mezrabotan group project is one of the most famous and effective Kurdish groups for children in educating children).

Since then, there have been some brave artists and their sexual orientation is part of their image: they want to shake people up and therefore provoke some conservative circles with their pride. For example, when Semyanî Perîzade released his first song "Alo", there was a real hype about it. Endless discussions were held, on topics such as "What is the legitimacy of a Kurdish woman, how should she be and what should she wear". When Semyanî herself spoke and announced that she is bisexual, this caused a gender discussion in Kurdish music and art. Today, she is generally accepted and taken seriously as a contemporary artist who has broken taboos.

The importance of LGBT people in the Kurdish militas fighting against the Islamic State

Gender, ethnicity, religion and sexual orientation have never created any issue in the Kurdish fight for cultural and political rights. Instead, many Kurdish groups and associations are supporting a society with equal rights for everyone. However, in the war against ISIS, gender (women) and sexual orientation became the main focus for the first time. ISIS fighters believe that if they are killed by women in the Syrian Democratic Forces (SDF), they will not go to heaven. In this way, Kurdish female fighters have become the biggest nightmare of ISIS terrorists. Then came TQILA, which stands for: "Queer Rebellion and Salvation Army". A militia for all those who refuse to adhere to classical gender roles and narrowly defined gender identities.
A series of photos have emerged showing masked militants holding a banner in front of bombed concrete buildings in Raqqa. There was a lot of excitement on the internet: next to a red flag and a pink banner decorated with an assault rifle and an anarchy sign, the fighters unfurled a banner that read, "These faggots are killing fascists!" In its founding brochure, the TQILA group announced that they were part of the International People's Revolutionary Guerrilla Forces (IRPGF), a volunteer army made up of radical leftist fighters from around the world. It has been obtained that the group was established in March 2017 to support the Syrian Democratic Forces in the attack on the ISIS base in Raqqa. The SDF spokesperson denied that the group is an official member of the coalition, but the group has significant support from the Kurds. The group posted a photo alongside its banner showing Heval Mahîr - the supreme commander of all foreign SDF brigades - with a purple flag. A few years later, a video was released in which Heval Mahîr talks about cooperation with TQILA in Raqqa.

References

LGBT rights
Human rights in Kurdistan